Laura Kabasomi Kakoma (born  on June 6, 1981), known by her stage name Somi, is a Grammy-nominated American-born singer, songwriter, playwright, and actor of Rwandan and Ugandan descent. Somi is the first African woman to be nominated for a Grammy Award in a Jazz category.

Biography 
Somi was born in  Champaign, Illinois, while her father was completing post-doctoral studies at the University of Illinois at Urbana–Champaign. When Somi was three years old, her family then moved to Ndola, Zambia, while her father worked for the World Health Organization.  In the late 1980s when her father became a professor at the University of Illinois, they returned to Champaign, where Somi attended both University Laboratory High School and Champaign Central High School.  She earned her undergraduate degrees in Anthropology and African Studies from the University of Illinois at Urbana–Champaign. She also holds a Master's degree from New York University's Tisch School of the Arts in Performance Studies.

In 2007, she licensed her independently recorded album Red Soil in My Eyes to the Harmonia Mundi/World Village label for her first international distribution deal. The record received wide critical acclaim with the hit single "Ingele" that maintained a Top 10 position on U.S. World Music Charts for several months.

In 2009, Somi signed with independent record label ObliqSound. Her label debut If the Rains Come First was released in North America on October 27, 2009, and subsequently debuted at no. 2 on Billboards World Music Chart and no. 21 on Billboards Heatseekers Chart. The album features South African trumpeter Hugh Masekela, Somi's long-time mentor, as a guest on one track. In March 2011, Somi recorded her first live concert album at the legendary Jazz Standard in New York City. It was released on Palmetto Records in August 2011.

In 2013, Somi signed her first major label deal with Sony Music to become one of the first artists on their relaunched historic jazz imprint Okeh Records. Her album and major label debut The Lagos Music Salon, which features Grammy-winning special guests Angelique Kidjo and Common and debuted at #1 on US Jazz Charts, was inspired by an 18-month sabbatical she took in Lagos, Nigeria. On the heels of much critical acclaim and a rapidly growing fan base, The Huffington Post and other publications dubbed Somi "the new Nina Simone". In March 2017, she released Petite Afrique as her second album on Okeh Records. The album, which won a 2018 NAACP Image Award for Outstanding Jazz Album, is a song cycle about the large West African immigrant community in Harlem, New York City in the face of rapid gentrification. It features special guest Aloe Blacc.

In July 2020, Somi released 'Holy Room - Live at Alte Oper' on her own label Salon Africana.  The live album, which also features Frankfurt Radio Big Band, was nominated for a 2021 Grammy Award for Best Jazz Vocal Album and won the 2021 NAACP Image Award for Outstanding Jazz Album,  Vocal.

Somi’s first original play, Dreaming Zenzile, is a musical based on the life of Miriam Makeba.  It premiered at The Repertory Theatre of St. Louis in September 2021 after the original production was shut down five days before opening night in March 2020 due to the Covid-19 pandemic.  She released a tribute album dedicated to Makeba, Zenzile: The Reimagination of Miriam Makeba (2022). As a writer and actor, Somi also uses her last name and goes by Somi Kakoma. 

Somi is a TED Senior Fellow, a United States Artists Fellow, a Soros Equality Fellow, and a Sundance Theatre Fellow. 

Somi currently lives in New York City.

Discography
 Eternal Motive (2003)
 Red Soil in My Eyes (2007)
 If the Rain Comes First (2009)
 Somi: Live at Jazz Standard (2011)
 The Lagos Music Salon (2014)
 Petite Afrique (2017)
 Holy Room - Live at Alte Oper (2020)
Zenzile: The Reimagination of Miriam Makeba (2022)

References

Further reading

External links
 Official Website
 "The dancer, the singer, the cellist ... and a moment of creative magic" (TED2015)

1979 births
Living people
American jazz singers
American people of Rwandan descent
American people of Ugandan descent
Musicians from Champaign, Illinois
University of Illinois Urbana-Champaign alumni
Tisch School of the Arts alumni
Jazz musicians from Illinois
21st-century American singers
21st-century American women singers